The first R class were a class of 62 destroyers built between 1916 and 1917 for the Royal Navy. They were an improvement, specifically in the area of fuel economy, of the earlier  destroyers. The most important difference was that the Admiralty R class had two shafts and geared turbines, compared with the three shafts and direct turbines of the Admiralty M class, but in appearance the R class could be distinguished from its predecessors by having the after 4-inch gun mounted in a bandstand.  The Admiralty ordered the first two of this class of ships in May 1915. Another seventeen were ordered in July 1915, a further eight in December 1915, and a final twenty-three in March 1916 (of which eleven were to a slightly modified design).

As well as these fifty ships to the standard 'Admiralty' design, twelve more R class were designed and built by the two specialist builders Yarrow Shipbuilders and John I. Thornycroft & Company to their own separate designs. Three were ordered from Thornycroft and four from Yarrow in July 1915, and two from Thornycroft and three from Yarrow in December 1915.

They were the last three-funnelled destroyers ordered by the Royal Navy (although  commissioned in 1973 had three funnels, these were not all on the centreline). All of these ships saw extensive service in World War I. Some saw service as minelayers. Eight R-class ships were sunk during the war and all but two of the surviving ships were scrapped in the 1920s and 1930s. One Admiralty R-class vessel, survived to see service in World War II as a convoy escort, making her the oldest destroyer to see wartime service with the Royal Navy. A second,  was transferred to the Royal Siamese Navy as Phra Ruang in September 1920.

Admiralty R-class ships 
Two prototypes were ordered in May 1915 as part of the 5th War Programme.
 , built by Swan Hunter & Wigham Richardson, Wallsend on Tyne; launched 3 June 1916; sold for breaking up 29 April 1927.
 , built by Swan Hunter; launched 17 July 1916; sold for breaking up 29 April 1927.

Seventeen ships were ordered in July 1915 as part of the 6th War Programme (as well as four of the Yarrow R class and three of the Thornycroft R class).

 , built by John Brown & Company, Clydebank; launched 14 May 1916; sold for breaking up 13 March 1930.
 , built by John Brown; launched 1 July 1916; delivered for breaking up 27 January 1937.
 , built by John Brown; launched 12 August 1916; delivered for breaking up 23 November 1936.
 , built by John Brown; launched 30 September 1916; sold for breaking up 5 November 1926.
 , built by William Denny and Brothers, Dumbarton; launched 2 July 1916; sold for breaking up 16 December 1926.
 , built by Denny; launched 29 August 1916; sold for breaking up 13 July 1926.
 , built by Denny; launched 23 November 1916; sold for breaking up July 1927.
 , built by William Doxford & Sons, Sunderland; launched 28 October 1916; sold for breaking up 13 July 1926.
 , built by Doxford; launched 9 December 1916; torpedoed in the North Sea by  9 August 1917.
 , built by J. Samuel White, Cowes; launched 28 June 1916; sold for breaking up August 1927.
 , built by Harland and Wolff, Govan; launched 7 October 1916; renamed Sable in December 1933, sold for breaking up (delivered) 28 January 1937.
 , built by Harland and Wolff, Govan; launched 15 November 1916; sold for breaking up 16 December 1926, but stranded while under tow en route to breakers 28 January 1927 and broken up at Aberavon.
 , built by R. & W. Hawthorn, Leslie and Company, Hebburn on Tyne; launched 1 June 1916; sold for breaking up 13 July 1926.
 , built by Swan Hunter and Wigham Richardson, Wallsend on Tyne; launched 29 August 1916; sold for breaking up 29 April 1927.
 , built by Alexander Stephen and Sons, Linthouse, Govan; launched 11 January 1917; sold for breaking up 16 December 1926.
 , built by Stephens; launched 18 April 1917; sold for breaking up 16 December 1926.

Eight ships were ordered in December 1915 as part of the 7th War Programme (as well as two more of the Thornycroft R class).

 , built by William Beardmore and Company, Dalmuir; launched 27 December 1916; sold for breaking up 16 December 1926.
 , built by Beardmore; launched 27 February 1917; sold for breaking up 29 April 1927.
 , built by John Brown; launched 30 October 1916; torpedoed by German torpedoboat S 50 in the North Sea 23 January 1917.
 , built by John Brown; launched 11 January 1917; sold for breaking up 4 March 1947.
 , built by Harland and Wolff, Govan; launched 3 February 1917; sold for breaking up 13 July 1926.
 , built by Harland and Wolff, Govan; launched 9 March 1917; sold for breaking up 16 December 1926.
 , built by Hawthorn Leslie; launched 27 September 1916; sold for breaking up 21 April 1928.
 , built by Hawthorn Leslie; launched 15 November 1916; sold for breaking up 7 October 1927.

Twenty-three ships ordered in March 1916 as part of the 8th War Programme (as well as three more of the Yarrow R class), of which twelve were to the same design as the previous batch.
 , built by Beardmore; launched 30 June 1917; sold for breaking up 17 May 1928.
 , built by John Brown; launched 10 March 1917; sold for breaking up 4 August 1927.
 , built by John Brown; launched 21 April 1917; sold for breaking up 26 July 1927.
 , built by Fairfield Shipbuilding and Engineering Company; launched 26 January 1917; sold for breaking up (delivered) 28 January 1937.
 , built by Harland and Wolff, Govan; launched 21 May 1917; sold for breaking up 26 June 1928.
 , built by Harland and Wolff, Govan; launched 20 April 1917; sold for breaking up 28 July 1934.
 , built by Hawthorn Leslie; launched 8 March 1917; sold for breaking up (delivered) 31 August 1936.
 , built by Hawthorn Leslie; launched 10 January 1917; sold for breaking up 1937.
 , built by Stephen; launched 22 May 1917; sold for breaking up 19 November 1929, but wrecked off South Wales while under tow en route to breakers 13 December 1929.
 , built by Stephen; launched 4 August 1917; mined in the North Sea 23 December 1917.
 , built by Swan Hunter; launched 26 November 1917; mined in the North Sea 23 December 1917.
 , built by Swan Hunter; launched 10 February 1917; sold for breaking up 27 January 1937, but wrecked off Falmouth while under tow en route to breakers 16 March 1937.

Admiralty Modified R-class ships 
The remaining eleven ships ordered in March 1916 were of the Admiralty Modified R class with a slightly increased breadth of 27 ft, a draught of 11 ft, and a tonnage of 1,085.
These ships had two funnels.

 , built by White; launched 23 December 1916; sold for breaking up 15 November 1928.
 , built by White; launched 24 February 1917; sold for breaking up 9 May 1921.
 , built by Scott's; launched 21 April 1917; sold for breaking up 15 November 1921.
 , built by Swan Hunter; launched 5 April 1917; sold for breaking up 17 May 1928.
 , built by Beardmore; launched 10 October 1917; sold for breaking up April 1928.
 , built by Doxford; launched 24 March 1917; sunk in collision with SS Ellerie in the Clyde 29 October 1918.
 , built by Doxford; launched 9 June 1917; sold for breaking up 7 January 1930.
 , built by Fairfield; launched 22 March 1917; sold for breaking up April 1928, wrecked off Horse Fort en route to breakers, wrecked sold 27 August 1928.
 , built by Palmers Shipbuilding and Iron Company; launched 7 June 1917; sold for breaking up 7 January 1930.
 , built by Palmers; launched 23 July 1917; sold for breaking up 13 July 1926.
 , built by Scott's; launched 2 August 1917; sold for breaking up 19 November 1929.

Thornycroft R-class ships 
 , built by John I. Thornycroft & Company, Woolston, launched 14 October 1916. Sold for breaking up 13 July 1926.
 , built by Thornycroft; launched 25 November 1916; sold back to Thornycroft 21 June 1920, who then sold her to the Thai Navy in September 1920. She was renamed Phra Ruang.
 , built by Thornycroft; launched 15 January 1917; sold for breaking up 26 July 1927.
 , built by Thornycroft; launched 10 March 1917; sold for breaking up 18 February 1930.
 , built by Thornycroft; launched 21 April 1917; sold for breaking up 6 February 1931.

Yarrow R-class ships 
These seven ships built by Yarrow Shipbuilders were sometimes classified as the Yarrow Later M-class destroyer. These ships had two funnels.

Four vessels were ordered in July 1915:
  - Laid down August 1915, launched 24 July 1916, completed September 1916. Sold for breaking up 5 November 1926.
  - Launched 30 September 1916 and completed late 1916.
  - Launched 25 November 1916 and completed 1916, mined in the North Sea on night of 22 December/23 December 1917.
  - Laid down August 1915, launched 5 February 1917, completed February 1917. Sold for breaking up 5 November 1926.

Three vessels were ordered in March 1916:
  - Laid down March 1916, launched 24 March 1917, completed May 1917. Sold for breaking up 29 April 1927.
  - Laid down March 1916, launched 19 May 1917, completed July 1917. Sold for breaking up April 1938.
  - Launched 4 August 1917 and completed 1917, torpedoed and sunk by German U-boat UC-17 off Dutch coast 15 August 1918.

See also
 List of destroyer classes of the Royal Navy

References

Bibliography
 
 British Destroyers: A History of Development, 1892–1953 Drawn by Admiralty Permission from Official Records and Returns, Ships' Covers and Building Plans, Edgar J. March 1966, Seeley, Service & Co .
 Destroyers of the Royal Navy, 1893–1981, Maurice Cocker, 1983, Ian Allan 
 British Destroyers, From Earliest Days to the Second World War Norman Friedman, 2009,

External links

Destroyer classes
 
Ship classes of the Royal Navy